Skinned Deep is a 2004 American slasher film directed and written by Gabriel Bartalos and starring Les Pollack, Aaron Sims, Kurt Carley, Linda Weinrib, Forrest J Ackerman, Eric Bennett, and Warwick Davis.

Plot
An old man, while driving, is attacked by a man wearing a metal mask, "Surgeon General" (Kurt Carley). Surgeon General runs the man off the road and kills him, before destroying the man's car.

While taking a family trip, the Rockwell family become lost on the highway. When their car gets a flat, father Phil (Eric Bennett) goes to a convenience store to find help and a strange old woman invites them to stay with her while one of her sons fixes their car. She introduces the family to her strange sons: Plates (Warwick Davis), Brain (Jason Dugre), and one whom the woman calls "Surgeon General".

When Mrs. Rockwell takes a picture of Surgeon General, he kills her. Plates starts throwing plates at Phil, who is then murdered by Surgeon General. The Rockwell children, Tina and Matthew, escape through a window and are pursued by Surgeon General and Plates. Matthew taunts Surgeon General who swipes at him and splits him in two. Tina is captured and knocked out. When she wakes up she is in a room covered in newspapers where she escapes out of a trap door. She finds a couple old bikers from part of a gang at the convenience store being served coffee by the old woman and begs for help from the family. She gets recaptured and it's assumed the gang are killed in a cutscene. Brain takes Tina to a park and shows her how to ride a motorcycle. In the end Tina manages to kill and escape the strange family, where she finds help from a policeman who turns out to be similar to the strange family.

Cast
 Forrest J Ackerman as Forrey
 Eric Bennett as Phil Rockwell
 Jason Dugre as Brain
 Warwick Davis as Plates
 Karoline Brandt as Tina Rockwell
 Peter Iasillo, Jr. as Petey
 Kurt Carley as Surgeon General
 Bill Butts as Graine
 Neil Dooley as Pig Pen
 Joel Harlow as Octobaby
 Jim O'Donoghue as Sheriff

Release

Reception
Dennis Harvey of Variety commended the film for its over-the-top set pieces, humor and break-neck pacing, calling it "funny and perversely monotonous". Dread Central's Steve Barton rated the film a score of two and a half out of five, commending the character designs, music, Davis's performance, and production values. Barton, however, criticized the film's cliches, and derivative plot. Ryan Larson from Bloody Disgusting called it "one of the most completely bonkers horror films of the 2000s", praising the film's effects, 80s retro style, and energetic pacing.

References

External links
 
 
 

2004 films
2004 comedy horror films
2004 horror films
2004 directorial debut films
2000s serial killer films
American comedy horror films
American serial killer films
American splatter films
2000s English-language films
2000s American films